The Insight and Islamic Awakening Front was a principlist electoral list for Iranian 2012 legislative election, led by Shahabodin Sadr. It ran on a platform advocating rapid reforms. The group is a split to United Front of Principlists. The front's leader was disqualified from the election by the Guardian Council.

References

Electoral lists for Iranian legislative election, 2012
Principlist political groups in Iran
2012 establishments in Iran